The Ryan (originally North American) Navion is a single-engine, unpressurized, retractable gear, four-seat aircraft originally designed and built by North American Aviation in the 1940s. It was later built by Ryan Aeronautical Company and the Tubular Steel Corporation (TUSCO). The Navion was envisioned as an aircraft that would perfectly match the expected postwar boom in civilian aviation, since it was designed along the general lines of, and by the same company which produced the North American P-51 Mustang.

Design and development
The Navion was originally designed at the end of World War II by North American Aviation as the NA-143 (but produced under the NA-145 designation). North American built 1,109 Navions in 1946–47, initially selling them at a below cost US$3,995, which later increased to $6,100, although the actual cost of construction was $9,000. These included 83 L-17As for the US Army and National Guard.

Ryan Aeronautical Company acquired the design in the summer of 1947, launching production at its San Diego factory in 1948. Ryan built 1,240 Navions (powered by  Continental O-470 engines or  Lycoming O-435 engines), including 163 aircraft for the US armed forces, before production ended in 1951, with Ryan wanting to concentrate on defense production.

Production rights passed to the TUSCO corporation, which flew a prototype of a revised version, the Navion Rangemaster G, on June 10, 1960 and set up the Navion Aircraft Company to build it. The Rangemaster G replaced the sliding canopy of the earlier Navions with a more conventional five seat cabin with access via car-type doors. Production began in 1961, and by mid-1962 was reported to be at a rate of 20 per month, but Navion Aircraft Company went bankrupt, and the rights to the Navion were picked up by the Navion Aircraft Corporation, set up by members of the American Navion Society in mid-1965.

Operational history

While Republic offered an amphibious aircraft, the Seabee, Cessna offered the 195, and Beechcraft offered by far the most successful type Bonanza, which remains in production in 2020. All of these aircraft, including the Navion were significantly more advanced than prewar civilian aircraft and they set the stage for aircraft built from aluminum sheets riveted to aluminum formers. It was thought that wartime pilots would come home and continue flying with their families and friends under more peaceful conditions, but the postwar boom in civilian aviation did not materialize to the extent the manufacturers envisioned.

The United States Army Air Force bought 83 L-17As from North American in 1946, as a liaison and staff transport aircraft, with 36 going to the Army and 47 to the National Guard. These were supplemented by 163 L-17Bs from 1948, which were ordered by the United States Air Force on behalf of the Army and National Guard, with 129 going to the Army and the rest to the National Guard. During the Korean War, the US Army's Navions added casualty evacuation and forward air controller to the aircraft's liaison and light transport duties. The Navion was phased out of front line service by 1957, with the aircraft handed over to the Civil Air Patrol or used as hacks.

Present day
, many Navions are still flying and there is an active Navion owners community. On 18 March 2003 Sierra Hotel Aero Inc of South St. Paul, Minnesota purchased the type certificate, design data, molds and tooling. Company stated in January 2013, that it was two to three years away from bringing the aircraft back into production. In the meantime Sierra Hotel Aero is carrying out re-manufacturing and upgrading for some owners of Navions.

Variants

North American NA-143
Two prototypes.
North American NA-145 Navion
North-American-built production aircraft, 1,027 built.
North American NA-154 Navion
Military version for the United States Army as the L-17A, 83 built.
Ryan Navion
Ryan-built production aircraft, 600 built.

Ryan Navion A
Improved Navion with a 205hp Continental E-185-9 engine, 602 built.

Ryan Navion B
Modified for the higher powered 260hp Lycoming GO-435-C2 engine, also known as the Super Navion 260, 222 built.
Tusco Navion D
Conversion by Tulsa Manufacturing Company with a 240hp Continental IO-470-P engine and tip tanks.
Tusco Navion E
Conversion Tulsa Manufacturing Company with a 250hp Continental IO-470-C engine and tip tanks.
Tusco Navion F
Conversion Tulsa Manufacturing Company with a 260hp Continental IO-470-H engine and tip tanks.
Navion G Rangemaster
Redesigned aircraft by Navion Aircraft Company with 260hp Continental IO-470H engine, integral cabin and tip tanks, 121, some built as the Rangemaster G-1 with a modified fin.
Navion H Rangemaster
Navion G with a 285hp Continental IO-520B engine, 60 built, an additional aircraft was built by the Navion Rangemaster Aircraft Company in 1974.
Ryan Model 72
One Navion B was modified as two-seat trainer for a United States Navy competition with the Temco Model 33 Plebe.

Camair Twin Navion
twin engine conversion Camair 480, 2 Continental O-470-B, 240 hp each. Camair 480C, 2 Continental IO-470- 260 hp each. 25+- built.
X-16 Bi-Navion
One twin-engined (130hp Lycomings) prototype designed and built by Dauby Equipment Company in 1952, production by Riley and later by Temco.
Temco Riley 55 Initial version of the twin engined Navion conversion.
D-16 Twin Navion
Production version of the X-16 with two 150hp Lycoming O-320 engines and strengthened wings, 19 conversions by Riley and 46 by Temco.
Temco D-16A
Improved D-16 conversion with two 170hp Lycoming O-340-A1A engines, nacelle tanks and 20 gallon each tip tanks, 144 gallons fuel total. 45 conversions.

Military
L-17A
Military designation for NA-154s delivered to the United States Army, 83 built, re-designated U-18A in 1962.
QL-17A
Six L-17As modified by TEMCO as remote-controlled drones for the United States Air Force.
L-17B
Military designation for Ryan-built Navion As delivered to the U.S.Army, 163 built, re-designated U-18B in 1962.
L-17C
L-17As modified by Ryan with improved brakes and increased fuel capacity, 35 modified, re-designated U-18C in 1962.
XL-17D
Three former XL-22As for evaluation.
XL-22A
Two Ryan-built Navion Bs for the U.S.Army, re-designated XL-17D.
U-18A
Former L-17As re-designated in 1962.
U-18B
Former L-17Bs re-designated in 1962.
U-18C
Former L-17Cs re-designated in 1962.

Operators

Civil
The Navion is popular with  private individuals and companies.

Military

Royal Hellenic Air Force

United States Air Force
United States Army
Air National Guard
Massachusetts Air National Guard

Specifications (Super 260 Navion)

See also

References

Notes

Bibliography

 Bridgman, Leonard. Jane's All the World's Aircraft 1951–52. London: Sampson Low, Marston & Company, Ltd., 1951.
 Bridgman, Leonard. Jane's All the World's Aircraft 1952–53. London: Sampson Low, Marston & Company, Ltd., 1952.
 Harding, Stephen. U.S. Army Aircraft Since 1947. Shrewsbury, UK: Airlife Publishing, 1990. .
 Huber, Mark. "Accidental Classic". Air & Space, October–November 2008, pp. 42–47.
 Garrison, Peter. "Navion". Flying, May 1973, Vol. 92, No. 5. pp. 42–48.
 Gilbert, James. "Used Aircraft Pilot Report: The Navion". Flying, April 1966, Vol. 78, No. 4. pp. 54–58.
 Lert, Peter. "Globe/Temco Swift & Ryan Navion." Vintage Aircraft Buyer's Guide & Price Digest. Challenge Series, Volume 3, 1989.
 Ryan Aeronautical Company. Navion Operation Manual 3rd ed., February 1, 1949.
 Simpson, R.W. Airlife's General Aviation. Shrewsbury, UK: Airlife Publishing, 1991. .
 Simpson, Rod. The General Aviation Handbook. Hinckley, UK: Midland Publishing, 2005. .
 Swanborough, F. G. and Peter M. Bowers. United States Military Aircraft since 1909. London: Putnam, 1963.
 Taylor, John W. R.  Jane's All the World's Aircraft 1962–63. London: Sampson Low, Marston & Company, Ltd., 1962.
 Taylor, John W. R.  Jane's All the World's Aircraft 1969–70. London: Sampson Low, Marston & Company, Ltd., 1969. .
 Taylor, Michael, J.H., ed. Jane's Encyclopedia of Aviation. Danbury, Connecticut: Grolier Educational Corporation, 1980. .
 Used Aircraft Guide. Norwalk, Connecticut: Aviation Consumer magazine (Belvoir Media Group LLC), 2010.  
 U.S. Bureau of Aeronautics. Technical Order 1L-17A-1:  Flight Handbook USAF Series L-17A, L-17B, and L-17C Aircraft, October 1, 1948.

External links

 Navion - Navion main site
 Sierra Hotel Aero Inc. - current type certificate holder
 Navion photos at San Diego Air & Space Museum Archives 
 L-17.ORG - L-17 information
 Popular Science, May 1946, Junior Edition of Mustang early article on Navion

Navion
Navion
1940s United States civil utility aircraft
1940s United States military utility aircraft
1940s United States military trainer aircraft
Low-wing aircraft
Single-engined tractor aircraft
Aircraft first flown in 1948